Adriana Kristina Leon (born October 2, 1992) is a Canadian professional soccer player who plays as a winger for English Women's Super League club Manchester United and the Canadian national team.

She previously played college soccer for NCAA Division I programs Notre Dame Fighting Irish and Florida Gators before playing professionally for the Boston Breakers, Chicago Red Stars, Western New York Flash, Sky Blue FC and Seattle Reign in the NWSL, Swiss club FC Zürich in the Nationalliga A, and West Ham United of the English Women's Super League. Leon made her senior international debut in 2012, and has represented Canada at two FIFA Women's World Cup tournaments and won Olympic gold at Tokyo 2020.

Early life
Born in Mississauga, Ontario, Leon was raised in Maple and moved with her family to King City in 2010 at the age of 16. Her extended family holds a controlling share of Canadian furniture store Leon's. Leon began figure skating before taking up ice hockey at the age of 10, playing seven seasons of minor hockey up to Midget AA level. In her final season she won both the Provincial Women's Hockey League title and a gold medal at the Ontario Women's Hockey Association provincial championships with a Toronto Jr. Aeros team that also consisted of future Canada ice hockey internationals Jill Saulnier and Erin Ambrose. While at The Country Day School, Leon played soccer, volleyball and rugby, earning the rugby team's MVP honour in 2009. She played youth soccer for Vaughan SC, Brams United and Mississauga Falcons. In 2009, Leon was part of the Team Ontario squad that won bronze at the Canada Summer Games and finished as the tournament's top scorer with seven goals in five matches having scored in every game.

College career
Leon accepted an athletic scholarship to attend the University of Notre Dame and played for the Notre Dame Fighting Irish women's soccer team in 2010 and 2011. As a freshman she made 23 appearances and scored four goals. In the 2010 College Cup final she came off the bench to score the lone goal in a 1–0 victory over the Stanford Cardinal and was named to the All-Tournament Team. As a sophomore, she was joint-second for the team lead with six goals in 20 appearances.

After two seasons with the Irish, Leon transferred to the University of Florida, where she played for coach Becky Burleigh's Florida Gators in 2012. She made 22 appearances, playing in every available match after missing the first three matches while touring Japan with the Canadian national U-20 team. Leon scored five goals including four game-winners for the Gators and helped the team to Southeastern Conference regular season and tournament titles.

Club career

Boston Breakers (2013)
Ahead of the inaugural 2013 NWSL season, Leon was named as one of 16 players subsidized by the Canadian federations as part of the initial NWSL Player Allocation. She was allocated to the Boston Breakers. Having been an unused substitute in the team's opening match, Leon made her professional debut on April 27, 2013 as an 84th-minute substitute for Sydney Leroux as part of a 2–1 win away at Western New York Flash. She scored her first goal in a 5–1 loss against Sky Blue FC on June 1, 2013.

Chicago Red Stars
On June 29, 2013, the Boston Breakers traded Leon to the Chicago Red Stars in exchange for Carmelina Moscato. She made 35 appearances in three seasons with Chicago, scoring one goal in each of the three seasons.

Western New York Flash
In November 2015, Western New York Flash acquired Leon along with Abby Erceg and the No. 9 overall pick in the 2016 NWSL College Draft from Chicago in exchange for Whitney Engen and a fourth-round pick in the 2017 NWSL College Draft. She made 10 appearances during the 2016 season including three starts without scoring before departing in August 2016.

FC Zürich
On August 30, 2016, Leon transferred to FC Zürich of the Swiss Nationalliga A for an undisclosed fee. She made five league appearances without scoring but had some standout performances in other competitions. She registered a goal and three assists in a 5–0 win over FC Luzern in the second round of the Swiss Cup before scoring again in the next round as Zürich beat FC Walperswil 8–1. On October 5, 2016, Leon starred in a UEFA Champions League round of 32 victory over Austrian side SK Sturm Graz, scoring a hattrick and registering a further three assists in a 6–0 victory. On December 1, 2016, it was announced that Leon and the club had mutually agreed to terminate her contract so that she could return to North America.

Boston Breakers (2017)
On January 30, 2017, it was announced that Leon had rejoined the Boston Breakers ahead of the 2017 season. She was named NWSL Player of the Week twice during the season: once for week three for her performance against Seattle Reign, scoring one goal and registering two assists as part of a 3–0 victory, and again in week 21 for a one goal and one assist performance in a 3–0 win over Washington Spirit. Leon appeared in all 24 Boston Breakers matches in 2017, scoring a total of six goals.

Sky Blue FC
The Breakers ceased operations prior to the start of the 2018 season and the players were redistributed within the league via the 2018 NWSL Dispersal Draft. Leon was selected in the second round by Sky Blue FC. She made two substitute appearances for the team before being traded.

Seattle Reign
On June 12, 2018, Leon was traded to the Seattle Reign FC in exchange for a fourth-round pick in the 2019 NWSL College Draft. Leon made six appearances for Seattle in 2018 including one start before the club opted not to retain her NWSL rights ahead of the 2019 season.

West Ham United
On January 12, 2019, Leon signed for West Ham United midway through the team's debut Women's Super League season. The move reunited Leon with Matt Beard who had been her head coach in Boston. In her debut campaign she made 10 appearances in all competitions, scoring three goals including two in a 3–1 win over Blackburn Rovers in the fourth round of the FA Cup. West Ham reached the FA Cup final for the first time in the club's history in 2019 before losing the final at Wembley Stadium 3–0 to Manchester City with Leon playing the full 90 minutes. The following season Leon was West Ham's top league goalscorer with five prior to the WSL season being curtailed due to the COVID-19 pandemic. On June 29, 2022, West Ham announced Leon had decided to leave the club upon the expiration of her contract that summer after three and a half seasons. She made a total of 59 appearances in all competitions and scored 12 goals.

Manchester United
On July 4, 2022, Leon signed a two-year contract with Manchester United.

International career

Youth
Leon represented Canada at under-20 level at the 2010 CONCACAF Women's U-20 Championship, starting all three group games and scoring twice in wins over Costa Rica and Guatemala as Canada topped the group. However, a 1–0 semifinal defeat to Mexico in extra-time and a further 1–0 defeat to Costa Rica in the third-place playoff meant Canada failed to qualify for the 2010 FIFA U-20 Women's World Cup.

In 2012, Leon was not included in the final squad for the 2012 CONCACAF Women's U-20 Championship. Canada's second-place finish qualified the team for the 2012 FIFA U-20 Women's World Cup and Leon was recalled to the squad for the tournament in Japan. She scored a first-half hattrick as Canada opened the group stage with a 6–0 win over Argentina but defeats against Norway and North Korea eliminated the team at the group stage.

Senior
In January 2013, Leon earned her first call-up to the senior Canada national team for the friendly 2013 Four Nations Tournament. She made her senior international debut against China on January 12, 2013, playing the full 90 minutes and scoring the only goal in a 1–0 victory. She played the full 90 minutes of all three games. She appeared in 16 of the 17 matches Canada played in 2013, scoring three goals.

In 2015, Leon was named to her first major international tournament as part of the 2015 FIFA Women's World Cup hosted by Canada. She made her World Cup debut on June 6, 2015 as a 77th-minute substitute against China in the opening match of the tournament. Leon was fouled in the penalty area by Zhao Rong in stoppage time, earning Canada a penalty which was scored by Christine Sinclair to win 1–0. She played in four of the five games as Canada were eliminated by England at the quarterfinal stage.

Having struggled for form and game time at club level, John Herdman dropped Leon from international contention in 2016, first omitting her from the 2016 CONCACAF Women's Olympic Qualifying Championship and then the 2016 Summer Olympics themselves where Canada won the bronze medal match against host nation Brazil. She returned to the NWSL in 2017 and her performances with Boston earned her a recall to the national setup. She scored in three of her six appearances for Canada in 2017.

At the 2018 CONCACAF Women's Championship Leon scored six goals (including four in a game against Cuba) and finished second in tournament's golden boot race, one goal behind Alex Morgan of the United States.

On May 25, 2019, she was named to the roster for the 2019 FIFA Women's World Cup. She made three substitute appearances in France for a combined 58 minutes as Canada were eliminated at the round of 16 by Sweden.

Having been left out of the squad for the previous Olympics, Leon was named to the delayed 2020 Summer Olympics squad in August 2021. She appeared in five of six games, scoring in a 1–1 group stage draw with Great Britain. Having successfully converted a penalty in the shootout victory over Brazil in the quarterfinals, Leon stepped up to take another penalty in the gold medal match but scuffed her kick low to Hedvig Lindahl's right. Despite this, Canada won the shootout 3–2.

In 2022, Leon appeared in all five matches at the 2022 CONCACAF W Championship including one start, and scored during a 3–0 semifinal win over Jamaica. Canada lost the final 1–0 to the United States with Leon appearing as a 67th-minute substitute.

Career statistics

Club summary

International summary

International goals

Scores and results list Canada's goal tally first, score column indicates score after each Leon goal.

Honours
Notre Dame Fighting Irish
 NCAA Women's Soccer Championship: 2010

Florida Gators
Southeastern Conference regular season: 2012
SEC Women's Soccer Tournament: 2012

West Ham United
Women's FA Cup runner-up: 2019 

Canada
 Summer Olympics gold medal: 2021
 CONCACAF W Championship runner-up: 2018, 2022

References

External links
 
 

 Boston Breakers player profile
 Notre Dame player profile
 Florida player profile
 Top Drawer Soccer player profile
 

1992 births
Living people
USL W-League (1995–2015) players
National Women's Soccer League players
Boston Breakers players
Chicago Red Stars players
Canada women's international soccer players
Canadian women's soccer players
Canadian expatriate women's soccer players
Expatriate women's soccer players in the United States
Notre Dame Fighting Irish women's soccer players
Florida Gators women's soccer players
2015 FIFA Women's World Cup players
Soccer players from Mississauga
Western New York Flash players
Canadian expatriate sportspeople in the United States
Expatriate women's footballers in Switzerland
FC Zürich Frauen players
NJ/NY Gotham FC players
Women's association football midfielders
Women's Super League players
Expatriate women's footballers in England
Canadian expatriate sportspeople in England
West Ham United F.C. Women players
2019 FIFA Women's World Cup players
Footballers at the 2020 Summer Olympics
Olympic soccer players of Canada
Olympic medalists in football
Medalists at the 2020 Summer Olympics
Olympic gold medalists for Canada
Manchester United W.F.C. players
Canadian expatriate sportspeople in Switzerland